Zálší is a municipality and village in Ústí nad Orlicí District in the Pardubice Region of the Czech Republic. It has about 200 inhabitants.

Administrative parts
The village of Nořín is an administrative part of Zálší.

Notable people
František Blažek (1863–1944), architect

References

Villages in Ústí nad Orlicí District